P101 may refer to:

Vessels 
 , a patrol boat of the Mexican Navy
 , a patrol boat of the Royal Australian Navy
 , a patrol boat of the Timor Leste Defence Force
 , a patrol boat of the Tongan Maritime Force

Other uses 
 Papyrus 101, a biblical manuscript
 PIK3R5, phosphoinositide 3-kinase regulatory subunit 5
 Programma 101, a desktop programmable calculator
 P101, a state regional road in Latvia